To Survive is the second album by Joan as Police Woman. It was released on June 9, 2008,  on CD, LP and digital download.

The album was released by Reveal Records in the United Kingdom, by Cheap Lullaby in the United States, and by PIAS in Europe and the rest of the world.

The album cover is a reference to Virginia Woolf; with the photography by Matt Mahurin.

In 2009, it was awarded a silver certification from the Independent Music Companies Association, which indicated sales of at least 30,000 copies throughout Europe.

Reception
The album received generally favorable reviews, earning a metascore of 76 on Metacritic. It was an Editor's Pick in the July 2008 issue of Paste, and ranked at #43 in Q'''s 50 Best Albums of the Year.

In its positive review, Spin wrote: "Stepping away from the ivories, Wasser wanders into a patch of violin tangles and glitchy twitters ('Holiday'), gets soulful support from horns ('Magpies'), and builds a song out of a Robert Frippish guitar lick, sustained synth chords, stark percussion, and a backup choir consisting only of herself ('Start of My Heart')."

"She addresses the dark stuff in relationships," enthused actress Juliette Lewis. "'To Be Lonely' is a very honest examination of the self, and 'Honor Wishes' will make sense to all of us who have loved a little too hard."

Track listing
 "Honor Wishes" (featuring David Sylvian)
 "Holiday"
 "To Be Loved"
 "To Be Lonely"
 "Magpies"
 "Start of My Heart"
 "Hard White Wall"
 "Furious"
 "To Survive"
 "To America" (featuring Rufus Wainwright)

The Japanese version of To Survive'' includes three bonus tracks:
 "No Question" (featuring David Sylvian)
 "Take Me"
 "Radish (To Be Free)"

References

2008 albums
Joan as Police Woman albums